Carya floridana (syn. Hicoria floridana) the scrub hickory, is a tree native to the Southeast United States, where it is endemic in central Florida.

Although it can grow to the height of 25 m (80 ft), many specimens are seen as shrubs 3–5 m tall with many small trunks. The leaves are 20–30 cm long, pinnate, with three to seven leaflets, each leaflet 4–10 cm long and 2–4 cm broad, with a coarsely toothed margin. The fruit is a nut 3–4 cm long and 2-2.5 cm diameter, with a thick, hard shell and a sweet, edible seed.

It is geographically separated from the similar black hickory (Carya texana). The scrub hickory intergrades with the pignut hickory (Carya glabra) where ranges overlap.

The seeds require stratification to germinate.

Genetics
Scrub hickory is a 64-chromosome species.

References

External links
Plants for a Future: Carya floridana

floridana
Trees of the Southeastern United States